Marcia Ann Gillespie (born 10 July 1944) is an African-American magazine editor, writer, professor, media and management consultant, and racial and gender justice activist. She previously served as editor-in-chief of Essence magazine and Ms. magazine. She co-authored the authorized biography Maya Angelou: A Glorious Celebration, and is currently working on her own memoir titled When Blacks Became Americans. She teaches media and communications at SUNY Old Westbury College as a visiting professor.

Early life and education 
Gillespie was born in 1944 in Rockville Centre, New York, to Charles M. Gillespie and Ethel Young Gillespie. She grew up in a working-class family; her father was a church sexton who also ran a floor-waxing business, and her mother was a domestic worker who operated a catering business. Gillespie and her sister, Charlene Gillespie, grew up in Long Island, New York. She graduated from a mostly white and Jewish high school and then enrolled in Lake Forest College in Lake Forest, Illinois, near Chicago, where she received a B.A. degree in American studies in 1966.

Career 
Upon graduation, Gillespie moved to New York City after being employed by Time-Life Books, Inc. as a researcher. In 1970, she was hired as a managing editor at the newly-founded African-American publication Essence Magazine. After being promoted to editor-in-chief a year later, at the age of 26, she started the process of transforming Essence into one of the fastest growing women’s publications in the United States, as well as a trusted source of inspiration, information, and affirmation for millions of African American women readers. In 1980, Gillespie left Essence to join Ms. magazine as a contributing writer. She went on to serve as contributing editor, executive editor, and finally editor-in-chief by 1992, making her the first African American woman editor-in-chief of a mainstream publication in the United States. Under Gillespie's leadership, Ms. magazine reached the most diverse readership in its history.

During her tenure at Essence, Gillespie also served as vice-president of Essence Communications, from 1975 to 1980, and as a member of the board of directors. She co-founded Liberty Media for Women, a limited liability corporation composed of women investors, and served as President. The company acquired Ms. magazine in November 1998 and launched the publication in March 1999. Negotiations of the magazine's transfer to the Feminist Majority Foundation, initiated by Gillespie, began in December 2000 and were officially completed by February 2001. In 2001, Gillespie ended her tenure as editor of Ms.

Since 1971, Gillespie has lectured widely on college and university campuses and to women's groups, and has authored innumerable articles and essays.

Gillespie serves as a member of the board of directors of the Planned Parenthood Federation of America and the Global Fund for Women. She previously served on the board of directors of the Rod Rodgers Dance Company, the Arthur Ashe Institute of Urban Health, the Black & Jewish Women of New York, and the Violence Policy Center in Washington, D.C. She was also appointed to the advisory board of the Aspen Institute, the New Federal Theater in New York City, and the Studio Museum in Harlem. She is currently a member of the National Council of Negro Women and the American Association of Magazine Editors.

Awards and recognition 
Gillespie is a recipient of the Lake Forest College Outstanding Alumni Award (1973); the New York Women in Communications Matrix Award (1978); the New York Association of Black Journalist's Life Achievement Award for Print Journalism; the Mary MacLeod Bethune award from the National Council of Negro Women; the Missouri Honor Medal for Distinguished Service in Journalism from the University of Missouri School of Journalism; and the National Magazine Award. She received a Doctor of Letters degree from her alma mater, Lake Forest College. In 1982, she was named by the March of Dimes as one of the “Top Ten Outstanding Women in Magazine Publishing”. She was also named by Time magazine as one of the" Fifty Faces for American's Future".

Works 
Maya Angelou: A Glorious Celebration (2008), Waterville, Me.: Thorndike Press/Gale Cengage Learning (co-authored with Rosa Johnson Butler and Richard A. Long).

References

External links 
A conversation with Marcia Ann Gillespie for WNED Public Television series Woman, 1976.
Marcia Ann Gillespie papers at the Sophia Smith Collection, Smith College Special Collections.

1944 births
Living people
American editors
Lake Forest College alumni
People from Rockville Centre, New York